In Norse mythology according to the Eddic poem Rígsþula, Erna was the mother of eleven sons by Jarl, the ancestors of the class of warriors in Norse society. Her father was Hersir, a tribal chief.

References
Dugdale-Pointon, TDP. (21 March 2001), Hersir, Viking, *http://www.historyofwar.org/articles/weapons_hersir.html
https://web.archive.org/web/20080725032556/http://www.cybersamurai.net/Mythology/nordic_gods/LegendsSagas/Edda/PoeticEdda/Rigsthula.htm

Characters in Norse mythology
Legendary progenitors
Women in mythology